(abbreviated as MIB; Jawi: ملايو اسلام براج) was officially proclaimed as the national philosophy of Brunei on the day of its independence on 1 January 1984 by Sultan Hassanal Bolkiah.

MIB is described as "a blend of Malay language, culture, and Malay customs, the teaching of Islamic laws and values and the monarchy system which must be esteemed and practiced by all". Islam is the official and state religion of Brunei; and MIB basically opposes the concept of secularism.

See also
 Malay Islamic identity
 Ketuanan Melayu
 Sumpah Pemuda of 1928

Notes and references

External links 

 

Politics of Brunei
1984 introductions
1984 establishments in Brunei
State ideologies